Golaghati is one of the 60 Legislative Assembly constituencies of Tripura state in India. It is in Sipahijala district and is reserved for candidates belonging to the Scheduled Tribes. It is also part of West Tripura Lok Sabha constituency.

Members of Legislative Assembly

 1977: Niranjan Debbarma, Communist Party of India (Marxist)
 1983: Budha Debbarma, Tripura Upajati Juba Samiti
 1988: Budha Debbarma, Tripura Upajati Juba Samiti
 1993: Niranjan Debbarma, Communist Party of India (Marxist)
 1998: Niranjan Debbarma, Communist Party of India (Marxist)

Election results

2018

See also
List of constituencies of the Tripura Legislative Assembly
 Sipahijala district
 Tripura West (Lok Sabha constituency)

References

Sipahijala district
Assembly constituencies of Tripura